Pteromalus is a genus of pteromalids in the family Pteromalidae. There are at least 430 described species in Pteromalus.

See also
 List of Pteromalus species

References

Further reading

External links

 

Pteromalidae